The Cuban National Series Rookie of the Year Award goes to the top newcomer in the Cuban National Series.

List

References

Rookie
Rookie player awards
Awards established in 1967